Nekkallu is a neighbourhood and a part of Urban Notified Area of Amaravati, the state capital of the Indian state of Andhra Pradesh. It was a village in Thullur mandal of in Guntur district, prior to its denotification as gram panchayat.

Demographics 

The average literacy rate stands at 61.70%.

Transport

Nekkallu is located on the Amaravathi and Mangalagiri route. APSRTC run buses provide transport services from Amaravathi and Mangalagiri to Nekkallu.

References

Neighbourhoods in Amaravati